The province of Ilocos Norte has 559 barangays comprising its 21 municipalities and 2 cities.

Barangays

References

Barangays
Ilocos Norte